Martin Dam is a concrete arch gravity dam on the Tallapoosa River in Alabama in the United States, about  southwest of Dadeville. Impounding the  Lake Martin, the dam was built in the 1920s to provide flood control, hydroelectric power generation and water supply. Originally known as the Cherokee Bluffs dam, the dam is named in honor of Thomas Wesley Martin, president of the Alabama Power Company during the dam's construction.

Preparations for construction of Martin Dam began in 1916 as Alabama Power began to purchase lands that would be flooded by its construction. Actual work on the dam commenced in 1923 and was completed in 1926; the lake filled to capacity for the first time on April 23, 1928 after heavy upstream flooding. However, the dam was not officially dedicated until 1936. At the time of completion, Lake Martin was the largest man-made body of water in the world. Filling the reservoir submerged the towns of Sousanna and Benson (also known as Kowaliga), as well as many historic Native American sites.

The lake is drawn down by an average of  each winter to facilitate flood control operations at Martin Dam.

Martin Dam's powerhouse contained three Francis turbines upon its original construction in 1927, with capacities of 45.8, 41 and 40.5 megawatts (MW). A fourth generator with a capacity of 55.2 MW was incorporated in 1952, bringing the total generating capacity to 182.5 MW. The power plant generates over 327 million KWh each year.

See also

List of largest reservoirs in the United States
List of reservoirs and dams in Alabama

References

Buildings and structures in Elmore County, Alabama
Buildings and structures in Tallapoosa County, Alabama
Dams in Alabama
Hydroelectric power plants in Alabama
Alabama Power dams
Properties on the Alabama Register of Landmarks and Heritage
United States power company dams
Dams completed in 1926